Gold mining in Nevada, a state of the United States, is a major industry, and one of the largest sources of gold in the world. In 2018 Nevada produced , representing 78% of US gold and 5.0% of the world's production. Total gold production recorded from Nevada from 1835 to 2017 totals , worth US$322.6 billion at 2020 values. Much of Nevada's gold production comes from large open pit mining using heap leaching recovery.  

The Nevada mining industry supported an average 14,787 direct employees in 2018, with about 75,000 additional jobs related to providing goods and services needed by the mining industry. The average pay for mining industry employees during this time was $97,600 per year, the third highest average private employment sector in the state.

Major mining companies such as Newmont Goldcorp and Barrick Gold Corporation operate many of the state's gold mines. Active mines include those at Jerritt Canyon and the Carlin Trend.

Although Nevada was known much more for silver in the 19th century, many of the early silver mining districts also produced considerable quantities of gold. The Comstock Lode produced  of gold through 1959, and the Eureka district produced .
The Robinson copper mine has produced well over  gold, along with over 4 billion pounds (1,500,000 tonnes) of copper.

Carlin Trend

Gold was discovered in the vicinity of Carlin in Eureka County in the 1870s, but production was small.  Placer deposits were discovered in 1907, but the deposits were too small to cause much excitement.  It was not until 1961 that Newmont Mining Corporation discovered the large low-grade gold deposit at Carlin that the mining industry began to take notice. The Carlin mine began producing gold in 1965, but at a gold price of US$35 per troy ounce, ore grades were still too low to cause a rush to northern Nevada.  It was not until the gold price escalated in the 1970s that mining companies began to target similar deposits.

Production from the trend surpassed  of gold in 2002. The Carlin and other mines along the trend pioneered the method of open-pit mining with cyanide heap leach recovery that is today used at large low-grade gold mines worldwide.

New ore deposits are still being discovered and developed along the trend. The South Arturo deposit was discovered by Barrick Gold in 2005. The deposit contains an estimated  of gold.

Goldfield

Goldfield was discovered in 1902, and began major gold production in 1904. The ore occurs in altered shear zones in Tertiary dacite and andesite.

Robinson/Ely

In 2017 the Robinson Mine produced 112,633,428 pounds of copper, 37,897 troy ounces of gold and 652,763 pounds of molybdenite with 617 employees.

Gold royalties
All mineral and gold production on public and private lands in Nevada is subject to a Net Royalty payable to the State. The gross proceeds from the sale of minerals minus allowable deductions determine the taxable net proceeds.  If the net proceeds from sales by a mine in the taxable year total $4 million or more, the tax rate is 5%.  For less profitable mines the tax rate is graduated down to 2%. Miners' net proceeds are also subject to federal corporate income tax of 21%. 

Because the NPM tax is an ad valorem property tax, the amount of the net proceeds times the property tax rate goes to the county where the mineral was extracted. Any additional amount of tax paid up to the 5% goes to the State. 

In 2017-2018 the Nevada net proceeds royalty raised $155.1 million (down from $255.6 million in 2012) from gold and silver production, of which the counties received $87.5 million (down from $127 million in 2012).

Gold Mining Companies in Nevada

 Barrick Gold
 Coeur Mining
 Hecla Mining
 KGHM Polska Miedź
 Kinross Gold
 Newmont Corporation
 SSR Mining
 Sprott Mining

See also

 List of active gold mines in Nevada
 Bald Mountain mine
 Cortez Gold Mine
 Getchell Mine
 Goldstrike mine
 Marigold mine
 Nevada Gold Mines
 Robinson Mine
 Round Mountain Gold Mine
 Carlin–type gold deposit
 Gold mining in the United States
 Silver mining in Nevada

References

External links
Gold Districts of Nevada, map & a brief writeup for 36 lode and 16 placer districts with significant production
 Nevada Gold Mines, joint venture between Barrick & Newmont
 Barrick:  Goldstrike Property
 Southern Nevada: The Boomtown Years 1900-1925
 Nevada Mineral Industry 2006, by Nevada Bureau of Mines & Geology
 Major mines of Nevada 2006, by Nevada Bureau of Mines & Geology
 Nevada: A very modern gold rush  at Mining Journal, 30 Mar 2012